Cottrell James Hunter III (December 14, 1968 – November 28, 2021) was an American shot putter and coach. He was the 1999 World Champion, but is perhaps best known for his involvement in the BALCO scandal and as the onetime spouse of sprinter Marion Jones. His personal best was 71' 9", (21.87 m)  thrown during a 2nd-place finish in the 2000 US Olympic Trials.  A month later he was tested positive for the performance-enhancing steroid Nandrolone at the Bislett Games, which was revealed before he had been scheduled to compete in the 2000 Summer Olympics.  He had previously competed at the 1996 Summer Olympics, finishing seventh.

The 6'1", 330 lb Hunter was a three-time All-American at Penn State University, where he still holds the outdoor and indoor shot put record (65'5" and 64'4½", or 19.93 m and 19.62 m respectively). He earned his B.A. in political science there in 1991. Hunter first began throwing the shot after repeatedly failing to make the basketball team at Hyde Park, New York's Franklin D. Roosevelt Senior High School.

Hunter first met Marion Jones when she was 16. They reconnected in 1995 when he was hired as a coach with the University of North Carolina track team. He was forced to resign from his position after repeatedly refusing to conform with school rules that prohibited coach-athlete dating. They married on October 3, 1998, only to divorce in 2002 following the publicity surrounding the BALCO scandal. Hunter resided in Holly Springs, North Carolina with his son from his third marriage, Nicko. He died on November 28, 2021, at the age of 52.

See also
List of Pennsylvania State University Olympians
List of sportspeople sanctioned for doping offences

References

External links
 C. J. Hunter biography at USA Track & Field
 C. J. Hunter photo, biography & stats at sporting-heroes.net
 "It's been going on for a long, long time", Black Athlete Sports Network, August 28, 2004

1968 births
2021 deaths
African-American male track and field athletes
American track and field coaches
Athletes (track and field) at the 1995 Pan American Games
Athletes (track and field) at the 1996 Summer Olympics
Athletes (track and field) at the 2000 Summer Olympics
Doping cases in athletics
NC State Wolfpack football coaches
Olympic track and field athletes of the United States
Pennsylvania State University alumni
Sports coaches from Washington, D.C.
American male shot putters
Athletes (track and field) at the 1991 Pan American Games
World Athletics Championships medalists
Pan American Games gold medalists for the United States
Pan American Games medalists in athletics (track and field)
Goodwill Games medalists in athletics
People from Apex, North Carolina
People from Holly Springs, North Carolina
World Athletics Championships winners
Competitors at the 1994 Goodwill Games
Competitors at the 1998 Goodwill Games
Medalists at the 1995 Pan American Games
Track and field athletes from Washington, D.C.